Wyatt Thomas Tucker Sr. (born May 25, 1950) is an American politician and former Republican state senator in the state of North Carolina. He served as co-chairman of the North Carolina Senate's State and Local Government Committee. Senator Tucker has been accused of the statement "I am the Senator, you are the Citizen, you need to be quiet," when responding to a citizen journalist's inquiry on North Carolina's Senatorial Rules and Procedures, though he said he was misquoted. In 2013 Sen. Tucker came under criticism for helping direct Rural Center funds to the development of a movie theater. In August 2017 Senator Tucker announced his intention to retire.

References

External links

Republican Party North Carolina state senators
Living people
1950 births
21st-century American politicians
Place of birth missing (living people)
North Carolina State University alumni